Gökhan Erdogan (born 4 April 1991) is a Turkish professional football player who plays for Darıca Gençlerbirliği.

References

External links

1991 births
Living people
Turkish footballers
People from Beypazarı
MKE Ankaragücü footballers
Mersin İdman Yurdu footballers
Süper Lig players
TFF First League players
Association football forwards